"That Once in a Lifetime" is a song by Greek singer Demis Roussos and was also released as a single from his 1978 English-language album Demis Roussos.

Background and writing 
The song was written by Dino Fekaris and Freddie Perren. The recording was produced by Freddie Perren.

Commercial performance 
The song peaked at no. 50 on the Billboard Easy Listening chart on the week of June 3, 1978 and at no. 47 on the ''Billboard Hot 100 on the week of July 22, 1978.

Track listing 
7" single Mercury SFL-2302 (1978, Japan, etc.)
 A. "That Once in a Lifetime" (3:38)
 B. "I Just Don't Know What to Do With Myself" (3:04)

Charts

References

External links 

 Demis Roussos — "That Once in a Lifetime" at Discogs

1978 songs
1978 singles
Demis Roussos songs
Mercury Records singles
Song recordings produced by Freddie Perren
Songs written by Dino Fekaris
Songs written by Freddie Perren